S1000D is an international specification for the procurement and production of technical publications.  It is an XML specification for preparing, managing, and publishing technical information for a product. It was initially developed by the AeroSpace and Defence Industries Association of Europe (ASD) for use with military aircraft. Since Issue the scope has been extended to include land, sea and even non-equipment products. It is widely used in civil as well as military products. S1000D is part of the S-Series of ILS specifications.

S1000D is maintained by the S1000D Steering Committee, which includes board members from ASD, the United States' Aerospace Industries Association (AIA), and the Air Transport Association (ATA), along with industry and defence representatives from most of the countries currently using the specification.
The specification is free to download and use, although commercial products and services are available..

Main principles 
S1000D requires information to be created as individual data items, called data modules (DM), which are structured with XML elements and metadata. Each DM is self-contained and may be used wherever that piece of information is needed.  They are organised into an hierarchical XML structure through the use of data module coding.  This permits the updating of single data items without necessarily changing the path in the XML structure which points to them.  Knowledge so partitioned and classified can therefore be shared among many publications, and updating of items in the underlying controlled source will automatically affect updating of the dependent publications. The actual XML hierarchy must be designed specifically for each different knowledge domain.

The DMs and supporting contents (graphics, multimedia, publishing information, training packages, etc.) are usually stored and maintained using a Common Source Database (CSDB).  The CSDB will typically contain all the components required for a product's Interactive Electronic Technical Publication (IETP) - which is all the elements required across all disciplines for the production of a suite of documentation for the operation and maintenance of the product.  Another common term often related to S1000D is Interactive Electronic Technical Manual (IETM) which is usually considered as an individual manual that is part of the IETP.  Due to the flexibility of XML, these IETM may range from a printed (paper or simple page-presentation) manual, through to a fully interactive digital manual with rich media, learning opportunities, and multiple formats of delivery.

Associated specifications 
S1000D is part of the S-Series of ILS specifications. There is an interface specification with S3000L Issue 1.0, titled S1003X

For S1000D content in English, the language should adhere to Simplified Technical English standard ASD-STE100.

Availability 
S1000D can be downloaded for free its project website.

History 
Prior to Issue 2, updates to the specification were known as changes.  When the standard reached Change 9, the proposed Change 10 became Issue 2.0 with previous Changes retro-referred to as Issue 1.x.  Issue 1.6 was the first publicly published version of S1000D and was notable as the first issue to include operator information (Crew) as well as maintainer content.  

S1000D does not provide, nor endorse any software tools to produce or distribute content in accordance with the standard.

See also 
 ATA 100
 IETM
 Common Source Data Base

References 

XML-based standards